Tom Heckert may refer to:

Tom Heckert Sr. (born 1938), American football coach and executive, head coach at Adrian College (1974–1981)
Tom Heckert Jr. (1967–2018), American football coach and executive, most recently general manager of the Cleveland Browns until 2012, son of the former